The 2002 Japan Series was the 53rd edition of Nippon Professional Baseball's postseason championship series. It matched the Central League champion Yomiuri Giants against the Pacific League champion Seibu Lions. The Giants swept the Lions in four games to win their 20th Japan Series championship.

Summary

See also
2002 World Series

Japan Series
Seibu Lions
Yomiuri Giants
Japan Series, 2002
Series